Dubbing (re-recording and mixing) is a post-production process used in filmmaking and video production, often in concert with sound design, in which additional or supplementary recordings (doubles) are lip-synced and "mixed" with original production sound to create the finished soundtrack.

The process usually takes place on a dub stage. After sound editors edit and prepare all the necessary tracks—dialogue, automated dialogue replacement (ADR), effects, Foley, and music—the dubbing mixers proceed to balance all of the elements and record the finished soundtrack. Dubbing is sometimes confused with ADR, also known as "additional dialogue replacement", "automated dialogue recording" and "looping", in which the original actors re-record and synchronize audio segments.

Outside the film industry, the term "dubbing" commonly refers to the replacement of the actor's voices with those of different performers speaking another language, which is called "revoicing" in the film industry. The term "dubbing" is only used when talking about replacing a previous voice, usually in another language. When a voice is created from scratch for animations, the term "original voice" is always used because, in some cases, this media is partially finished before the voice is implemented. The voice work would still be part of the creation process, thus being considered the official voice.

Origins
Films, videos, and sometimes video games are often dubbed into the local language of a foreign market. In foreign distribution, dubbing is common in theatrically released films, television films, television series, cartoons, and anime.

In many countries dubbing was adopted, at least in part, for political reasons. In authoritarian states such as Fascist Italy and Francoist Spain, dubbing could be used to enforce particular ideological agendas, excising negative references to the nation and its leaders and promoting standardised national languages at the expense of local dialects and minority languages. In post-Nazi Germany, dubbing was used to downplay events in the country's recent past, as in the case of the dub of Alfred Hitchcock's Notorious, where the Nazi organisation upon which the film's plot centres was changed to a drug smuggling enterprise. First post-WWII movie dub was Konstantin Zaslonov (1949) dubbed from Russian to the Czech language. In Western Europe after World War II, dubbing was attractive to many film producers as it helped to enable co-production between companies in different countries, in turn allowing them to pool resources and benefit from financial support from multiple governments. Use of dubbing meant that multi-national casts could be assembled and were able to use their preferred language for their performances, with appropriate post-production dubs being carried out before distributing versions of the film in the appropriate language for each territory.

Methods

ADR/post-sync

Automated dialogue replacement (ADR) is the process of re-recording dialogue by the original actor (or a replacement actor) after the filming process to improve audio quality or make changes to the originally scripted dialog. In the early days of talkies, a loop of film would be cut and spliced together for each of the scenes that needed to be rerecorded, then one-by-one the loops would be loaded onto a projector. For each scene the loop would be played over and over while the voice actor performed the lines trying to synchronize them to the filmed performance. This was known as "looping" or a "looping session". Loading and reloading the film loops while the talent and recording crew stood by was a tedious process. Later, video tape and then digital technology replaced the film loops and the process became known as automated dialogue replacement (ADR).

In conventional film production, a production sound mixer records dialogue during filming. During post-production, a supervising sound editor, or ADR supervisor, reviews all of the dialogue in the film and decides which lines must be re-recorded. ADR is recorded during an ADR session, which takes place in a specialized sound studio. Multiple takes are recorded and the most suitable take becomes the final version, or portions of multiple takes may be edited together. The ADR process does not always take place in a post-production studio. The process may be recorded on location, with mobile equipment. ADR can also be recorded without showing the actor the image they must match, but by having them listen to the performance, since some actors believe that watching themselves act can degrade subsequent performances. The director may be present during ADR, or alternatively, they may leave it up to a trusted sound editor, an ADR specialist, and the performers.

 the automated process includes sophisticated techniques including automatically displaying lines on-screen for the talent, automated cues, shifting the audio track for accurate synchronization, and time-fitting algorithms for stretching or compressing portions of a spoken line. There is even software that can sort out spoken words from ambient sounds in the original filmed soundtrack and detect the peaks of the dialog and automatically time-fit the new dubbed performance to the original to create perfect synchronization.

Sometimes, an actor other than the original actor is used during ADR. One famous example is the Star Wars character Darth Vader, portrayed by David Prowse; in post-production, James Earl Jones dubbed the voice of Vader.
In India, the process is simply known as "dubbing", while in the UK, it is also called "post-synchronization" or "post-sync". The insertion of voice actor performances for animation, such as computer generated imagery or animated cartoons, is often referred to as ADR although it generally does not replace existing dialogue.

The ADR process may be used to:

remove extraneous sounds such as production equipment noise, traffic, wind, or other undesirable sounds from the environment
change the original lines recorded on set to clarify context
improve diction or modify an accent
improve comedic timing or dramatic timing
correct technical issues with synchronization
use a studio-quality singing performance or provide a voice-double for actors who are poor vocalists
add or remove content for legal purposes (such as removing an unauthorized trademarked name)
add or remove a product placement
correct a misspoken line not caught during filming.
replace "foul language" for TV broadcasts of the media or if the scene in question has a young actor involved.

Other examples include:
 Jean Hagen provided Debbie Reynolds' voice in two scenes of Singin' in the Rain (1952). Ironically, the film's story has Reynolds' character, Kathy Seldon, dubbing the voice for Hagen's character, Lina Lamont, due to Lina's grating voice and strong New York accent. Hagen used her own normal melodious voice to portray Kathy dubbing for Lina. The film, which takes place in Hollywood as talking pictures are taking over from silent films, also portrays another character, Cosmo Brown, played by Donald O'Connor, as inventing the idea of using one actor to provide the voice for another.
 Marni Nixon provided the singing voice for the character Eliza Doolittle, otherwise played by Audrey Hepburn, in the 1964 musical film My Fair Lady. Nixon was also the singing voices for Deborah Kerr in The King and I and Natalie Wood in West Side Story, among many others.
 Ray Park, who acted as Darth Maul from Star Wars: Episode I – The Phantom Menace had his voice dubbed over by Peter Serafinowicz
 Frenchmen Philippe Noiret and Jacques Perrin, who were dubbed into Italian for Cinema Paradiso
 Austrian bodybuilder Arnold Schwarzenegger, dubbed for Hercules in New York
 Argentine boxer Carlos Monzón, dubbed by a professional actor for the lead in the drama La Mary
 Gert Fröbe, who played Auric Goldfinger in the James Bond film Goldfinger, dubbed by Michael Collins
 George Lazenby's James Bond in On Her Majesty's Secret Service, dubbed for a portion of the film by George Baker, since Bond was undercover and impersonating Baker's own character.
 Andie MacDowell's Jane, in Greystoke: The Legend of Tarzan, Lord of the Apes, who was dubbed by Glenn Close
 Tom Hardy, who portrayed Bane in The Dark Knight Rises, re-dubbed half of his own lines for ease of viewer comprehension
 Harvey Keitel was dubbed by Roy Dotrice in post production for Saturn 3
 Dave Coulier dubbed replacement of swear words for Richard Pryor in multiple TV versions of his movies
 Doug Jones was dubbed by Laurence Fishburne in post production for Fantastic Four: Rise of the Silver Surfer

Rythmo band
An alternative method to dubbing, called "rythmo band" (or "lip-sync band"), has historically been used in Canada and France. It provides a more precise guide for the actors, directors, and technicians, and can be used to complement the traditional ADR method. The "band" is actually a clear 35 mm film leader on which the dialogue is hand-written in India ink, together with numerous additional indications for the actor—including laughs, cries, length of syllables, mouth sounds, breaths, and mouth openings and closings. The rythmo band is projected in the studio and scrolls in perfect synchronization with the picture.

Studio time is used more efficiently, since with the aid of scrolling text, picture, and audio cues, actors can read more lines per hour than with ADR alone (only picture and audio). With ADR, actors can average 10–12 lines per hour, while rythmo band can facilitate the reading of 35-50 lines per hour.

However, the preparation of a rythmo band is a time-consuming process involving a series of specialists organized in a production line. This has prevented the technique from being more widely adopted, but software emulations of rythmo band technology overcome the disadvantages of the traditional rythmo band process and significantly reduce the time needed to prepare a dubbing session.

Translation process
For dubs into a language other than the original language, the dubbing process includes the following tasks:
 Translation
 Dialog writing:
 Take segmentation
 Insertion of dubbing symbols
 Dialogue writing and the emulation of natural discourse
 Lip-sync

Sometimes the translator performs all five tasks. In other cases, the translator just submits a rough translation and a dialogue writer does the rest. However, the language expertise of translator and dialog writing is different; translators must be proficient in the source language, while dialog writers must be proficient the target language.

Dialog writing

The dialogue writer's role is to make the translation sound natural in the target language, and to make the translation sound like a credible dialogue instead of merely a translated text.

Another task of dialogue writers is to check whether a translation matches an on-screen character's mouth movements or not, by reading aloud simultaneously with the character. The dialogue writer often stays in the recording setting with the actors or the voice talents, to ensure that the dialogue is being spoken in the way that it was written to be, and to avoid any ambiguity in the way the dialogue is to be read (focusing on emphasis, intonation, pronunciation, articulation, pronouncing foreign words correctly, etc.). The overall goal is to make sure the script creates the illusion of authenticity of the spoken language. A successful localization product is one that feels like the original character is speaking the target language. Therefore, in the localization process, the position of the dialogue writing or song writing is extremely important.

Global use

Localization
Localization is the practice of adapting a film or television series from one region of the world for another. In contrast to pure translation, localization encompasses adapting the content to suit the target audience. For example, culture-specific references may be replaced and footage may be removed or added.

Dub localization is a contentious issue in cinephilia amongst aficionados of foreign filmmaking and television programs, particularly anime fans. While some localization is virtually inevitable in translation, the controversy surrounding how much localization is "too much" is often discussed in such communities, especially when the final dub product is significantly different from the original. Some fans frown on any extensive localization, while others expect it, and to varying degrees, appreciate it.

The new voice track is usually spoken by a voice actor. In many countries, actors who regularly perform this duty remain little-known, with the exception of particular circles (such as anime fandom) or when their voices have become synonymous with roles or actors whose voices they usually dub. In the United States, many of these voice artists may employ pseudonyms or go uncredited due to Screen Actors Guild regulations or the desire to dissociate themselves from the role.

Africa

North Africa, Western Asia
In Algeria, Morocco, and Tunisia, most foreign movies (especially Hollywood productions) are shown dubbed in French. These movies are usually imported directly from French film distributors. The choice of movies dubbed into French can be explained by the widespread use of the French language. Another important factor is that local theaters and private media companies do not dub in local languages in order to avoid high costs, but also because of the lack of both expertise and demand.

Beginning in the 1980s, dubbed series and movies for children in Modern Standard Arabic became a popular choice among most TV channels, cinemas and VHS/DVD stores. However, dubbed films are still imported, and dubbing is performed in the Levant countries with a strong tradition of dubbing (mainly Syria, Lebanon and Jordan). Egypt was the first Arabian country in charge of dubbing Disney movies in 1975 and used to do it exclusively in Egyptian Arabic rather than Modern Standard Arabic until 2011, and since then many other companies started dubbing their productions in this dialect. Beginning with Encanto, Disney movies are now dubbed in both dialects.

In the Arabic-speaking countries, children shows (mainly cartoons & kids sitcoms) are dubbed in Arabic, otherwise Arabic subtitles are used. The only exception was telenovelas dubbed in Standard Arabic, or dialects, but also Turkish series, most notably Gümüş, in Syrian Arabic.

An example of Arabic voice actors that dub for certain performers is Safi Mohammed for Elijah Wood.

In Tunisia, the Tunisia National Television (TNT), the public broadcaster of Tunisia, is not allowed to show any content in any language other than Arabic, which forces it to broadcast only dubbed content (this restriction was recently removed for commercials). During the 1970s and 1980s, TNT (known as ERTT at the time) started dubbing famous cartoons in Tunisian and Standard Arabic. However, in the private sector, television channels are not subject to the language rule.

South Africa
In South Africa, many television programs were dubbed in Afrikaans, with the original soundtrack (usually in English, but sometimes Dutch or German) "simulcast" in FM stereo on Radio 2000. These included US series such as The Six Million Dollar Man, (Steve Austin: Die Man van Staal) Miami Vice (Misdaad in Miami), Beverly Hills 90210, and the German detective series Derrick.

As a result of the boycott by the British actors' union Equity, which banned the sale of most British television programs, the puppet series The Adventures of Rupert Bear was dubbed into South African English, as the original voices had been recorded by Equity voice artists.

This practice has declined as a result of the reduction of airtime for the language on SABC TV, and the increase of locally produced material in Afrikaans on other channels like KykNet. Similarly, many programs, such as The Jeffersons, were dubbed into Zulu, but this has also declined as local drama production has increased. However, some animated films, such as Maya the Bee, have been dubbed in both Afrikaans and Zulu by local artists. In 2018, eExtra began showing the Turkish drama series Paramparça dubbed in Afrikaans as Gebroke Harte or "Broken Hearts", the first foreign drama to be dubbed in the language for twenty years. On extra they have many Turkish series. Kara Sevda which is Bittersoet. They also have Istanbullu Gelin which is Deur dik en deun. They have Yasak Elma which is Doodsondes. They also have Elif.

Uganda
Uganda's own film industry is fairly small, and foreign movies are commonly watched. The English sound track is often accompanied by the Luganda translation and comments, provided by an Ugandan "video jockey" (VJ). VJ's interpreting and narration may be available in a recorded form or live.

Asia

Azerbaijan
In Azerbaijan, dubbing is rare, as most Azerbaijani channels such as ARB Günəş air voice-overs or Azerbaijan originals.

China
China has a long tradition of dubbing foreign films into Mandarin Chinese, starting in the 1930s. While during the Republic of China era Western motion pictures may have been imported and dubbed into Chinese, since 1950 Soviet movies, dubbed primarily in Shanghai, became the main import. Beginning in the late 1970s, in addition to films, popular TV series from the United States, Japan, Brazil, and Mexico were also dubbed. The Shanghai Film Dubbing Studio has been the most well-known studio in the film dubbing industry in China. In order to generate high-quality products, they divide each film into short segments, each one lasting only a few minutes, and then work on the segments one-by-one. In addition to the correct meaning in translation, they make tremendous effort to match the lips of the actors to the dialogue. As a result, the dubbing in these films generally is not readily detected. The cast of dubbers is acknowledged at the end of a dubbed film. Several dubbing actors and actresses of the Shanghai Film Dubbing Studio have become well-known celebrities, such as Qiu Yuefeng, Bi Ke, Li Zi, and Liu Guangning. In recent years, however, especially in the larger cities on the east and south coasts, it has become increasingly common for movie theaters to show subtitled versions with the original soundtracks intact.

Motion pictures are also dubbed into the languages of some of China's autonomous regions. Notably, the Translation Department of the Tibetan Autonomous Region Movie Company (西藏自治区电影公司译制科) has been dubbing movies into the Tibetan language since the 1960s. In the early decades, it would dub 25 to 30 movies each year, the number rising to 60-75 by the early 2010s.
Motion pictures are dubbed for China's Mongol- and Uyghur-speaking markets as well.

Chinese television dramas are often dubbed to Standard Mandarin by professional voice actors for a number of reasons.

Hong Kong
In Hong Kong, foreign television programs, except for English-language and Mandarin television programs, are dubbed in Cantonese. English-language and Mandarin programs are generally shown in their original with subtitles. Foreign films, such as most live-action and animated films (such as anime and Disney), are usually dubbed in Cantonese. However most cinemas also offer subtitled versions of English-language films.

For the most part, foreign films and TV programs, both live-action and animated, are generally dubbed in both Mandarin and Cantonese. For example, in The Lord of the Rings film series, Elijah Wood's character Frodo Baggins was dubbed into Mandarin by Jiang Guangtao for China and Taiwan. For the Cantonese localization, there were actually two dubs for Hong Kong and Macau. In the first Cantonese dub, he was voiced by Leung Wai Tak, while in the second Cantonese dub, he was voiced by Bosco Tang.

Taiwan
Taiwan dubs some foreign films and TV series in Mandarin Chinese. Until the mid-1990s, the major national terrestrial channels both dubbed and subtitled all foreign programs and films and, for some popular programs, the original voices were offered in second audio program. Gradually, however, both terrestrial and cable channels stopped dubbing for prime time U.S. shows and films, while subtitling continued.

In the 2000s, the dubbing practice has differed depending on the nature and origin of the program. Animations, children's shows and some educational programs on PTS are mostly dubbed. English live-action movies and shows are not dubbed in theaters or on television. Japanese TV dramas are no longer dubbed, while Korean dramas, Hong Kong dramas and dramas from other Asian countries are still often dubbed. Korean variety shows are not dubbed. Japanese and Korean films on Asian movie channels are still dubbed. In theaters, most foreign films are not dubbed, while animated films and some films meant for children offer a dubbed version. Hong Kong live-action films have a long tradition of being dubbed into Mandarin, while more famous films offer a Cantonese version.

A list for Mandarin and Cantonese voice artists that dub for actors are shown here.

Georgia
In Georgia, original soundtracks are kept in films and TV series, but with voice-over translation. There are exceptions, such as some children's cartoons.

India

In India, where "foreign films" are synonymous with "Hollywood films", dubbing is done mostly in Hindi, Tamil and Telugu. Dubbing is rarely done with the other major Indian languages, namely Bengali, Gujarati, Kannada, Malayalam, Marathi, and Odia, due to lack of significant market size. Despite this, some Kannada and Malayalam dubs of children television programs can be seen on the Sun TV channel. The dubbed versions are released into the towns and lower tier settlements of the respective states (where English penetration is low), often with the English-language originals released in the metropolitan areas. In all other states, the English originals are released along with the dubbed versions, where often the dubbed version collections are more outstanding than the originals. Spider-Man 3 was also done in the Bhojpuri language, a language popular in eastern India in addition to Hindi, Tamil and Telugu. A Good Day to Die Hard, the most recent installment in the Die Hard franchise, was the first ever Hollywood film to receive a Punjabi language dub as well.

Most TV channels mention neither the Indian-language dubbing credits, nor its staff, at the end of the original ending credits, since changing the credits casting for the original actors or voice actors involves a huge budget for modifying, making it somewhat difficult to find information for the dubbed versions. The same situation is encountered for films. Sometimes foreign programs and films receive more than one dub, such as for example, Jumanji, Dragonheart and Van Helsing having two Hindi dubs. Information for the Hindi, Tamil and Telugu voice actors who have done the voices for specific actors and for their roles on foreign films and television programs are published in local Indian data magazines, for those that are involved in the dubbing industry in India. But on a few occasions, there are some foreign productions that do credit the dubbing cast, such as animated films like the Barbie films, and some Disney films. Disney Channel original series released on DVD with their Hindi dubs show a list of the artists in the Hindi dub credits, after the original ending credits. Theatrical releases and VCD releases of foreign films do not credit the dubbing cast or staff. The DVD releases, however, do have credits for the dubbing staff, if they are released multilingual. As of recently, information for the dubbing staff of foreign productions have been expanding due to high demands of people wanting to know the voice actors behind characters in foreign works. Large dubbing studios in India include Sound & Vision India, Main Frame Software Communications, Visual Reality, ZamZam Productions, Treasure Tower International, Blue Whale Entertainment, Jai Hand Entertainment, Sugar Mediaz, Rudra Sound Solutionz and voxcom.

Indonesia
Unlike movie theaters in most Asian countries, those in Indonesia show foreign movies with subtitles. Then a few months or years later, those movies appear on TV either dubbed in Indonesian or subtitled. Kids shows are mostly dubbed, though even in cartoon series, songs typically aren't dubbed, but in big movies such as Disney movies, both speaking and singing voice are cast for the Indonesian dub. Adult films are mostly subtitled but sometimes they can be dubbed as well, and because there aren't many Indonesian voice actors, multiple characters might have the exact same voice.

Reality shows are not dubbed in Indonesian, because those are not in a planned interaction like with movies and TV shows, so if they appear in TV, they will appear with subtitles. All Malay language TV shows, including animated ones (such as Upin & Ipin), are also subtitled instead, likely due to the language's mutual intelligibility with Indonesian.

Iran

In Iran, International foreign films and television programs are dubbed in Persian. Dubbing began in 1946 with the advent of movies and cinemas in the country. Since then, foreign movies have always been dubbed for the cinema and TV foreign films and television programs are subtitled in Persian. Using various voice actors and adding local hints and witticisms to the original contents, dubbing played a major role in attracting people to the cinemas and developing an interest in other cultures. The dubbing art in Iran reached its apex during the 1960s and 1970s with the inflow of American, European and Hindi movies.

The most famous musicals of the time, such as My Fair Lady and The Sound of Music, were translated, adjusted and performed in Persian by the voice artists. Since the 1990s, for political reasons and under pressure from the state, the dubbing industry has declined, with movies dubbed only for the state TV channels. During recent years, DVDs with Persian subtitles have found a market among viewers for the same reason, but most people still prefer the Persian-speaking dubbed versions. Recently, privately operated companies started dubbing TV series by hiring famous dubbers. However, the dubs which these companies make are often unauthorized and vary greatly in terms of quality.

A list of Persian voice actors that associate with their actor counterparts are listed here.

Israel
In Israel, only children's movies and TV programming are dubbed in Hebrew. In programs aimed at teenagers and adults, dubbing is never considered for translation, not only because of its high costs, but also because the audience is mainly multi-lingual. Most viewers in Israel speak at least one European language in addition to Hebrew, and a large part of the audience also speaks Arabic. Therefore, most viewers prefer to hear the original soundtrack, aided by Hebrew subtitles. Another problem is that dubbing does not allow for translation into two different languages simultaneously, as is often the case of Israeli television channels that use subtitles in Hebrew and another language (like Russian) simultaneously.

Japan
In Japan, many television programs appear on Japanese television subtitled or dubbed if they are intended for children. When the American film Morocco was released in Japan in 1931, subtitles became the mainstream method of translating TV programs and films in Japan. Later, around the 1950s, foreign television programs and films began to be shown dubbed in Japanese on television. The first ones to be dubbed into Japanese were the 1940s Superman cartoons in 1955.

Due to the lack of video software for domestic television, video software was imported from abroad. When the television program was shown on television, it was mostly dubbed. There was a character limit for a small TV screen at a lower resolution, and this method was not suitable for the poor elderly and illiterate eye, as was audio dubbing. Presently, TV shows and movies (both those aimed at all ages and adults-only) are shown dubbed with the original language and Japanese subtitles, while providing the original language option when the same film is released on VHS, DVD and Blu-ray. Laserdisc releases of Hollywood films were almost always subtitled, films alike Godzilla: King of the Monsters.

Adult cartoons such as South Park and The Simpsons are shown dubbed in Japanese on the WOWOW TV channel. South Park: Bigger, Longer and Uncut was dubbed in Japanese by different actors instead of the same Japanese dubbing-actors from the cartoon because it was handled by a different Japanese dubbing studio, and it was marketed for the Kansai market. In Japanese theaters, foreign-language movies, except those intended for children, are usually shown in their original version with Japanese subtitles. Foreign films usually contain multiple Japanese-dubbing versions, but with several different original Japanese-dubbing voice actors, depending upon which TV station they are aired. NHK, Nippon TV, Fuji TV, TV Asahi, and TBS usually follow this practice, as do software releases on VHS, Laserdisc, DVD and Blu-ray. As for recent foreign films being released, there are now some film theaters in Japan that show both dubbed and subtitled editions.

On 22 June 2009, 20th Century Fox's Japanese division has opened up a Blu-ray lineup known as "Emperor of Dubbing", dedicated at having multiple Japanese dubs of popular English-language films (mostly Hollywood films) as well as retaining the original scripts, releasing them altogether in special Blu-ray releases. These also feature a new dub created exclusively for that release as a director's cut, or a new dub made with a better surround sound mix to match that of the original English mix (as most older Japanese dubbings were made on mono mixes to be aired on TV). Other companies have followed practice, like Universal Pictures's Japanese division NBCUniversal Entertainment Japan opening up "Reprint of Memories", along with Warner Bros Japan having "Power of Dubbing", which act in a similar way by re-packaging all the multiple Japanese dubs of popular films and putting them out as Special Blu-ray releases.

"Japanese dub-over artists" provide the voices for certain performers, such as those listed in the following table:

Pakistan
In Pakistan "foreign films", and cartoons are not normally dubbed locally. Instead, foreign films, anime and cartoons, such as those shown on Nickelodeon Pakistan and Cartoon Network Pakistan, are dubbed in Hindi in India, as Hindi and Urdu, the national language of Pakistan, are mutually intelligible.
However, soap operas from Turkey are now dubbed in Urdu and have gained increased popularity at the expense of Indian soap operas in Hindi. This has led to protests from local producers that these are a threat to Pakistan's television industry, with local productions being moved out of peak viewing time or dropped altogether. Similarly, politicians leaders have expressed concerns over their content, given Turkey's less conservative culture.

Philippines
In the Philippines, media practitioners generally have mixed practices regarding whether to dub television programs or films, even within the same kind of medium. In general, the decision whether to dub a video production depends on a variety of factors such as the target audience of the channel or programming bloc on which the feature will be aired, its genre, and/or outlet of transmission (e.g. TV or film, free or pay-TV).

Free-to-air TV
The prevalence of media needing to be dubbed has resulted in a talent pool that is very capable of syncing voice to lip, especially for shows broadcast by the country's three largest networks. It is not uncommon in the Filipino dub industry to have most of the voices in a series dubbing by only a handful of voice talents. Programs originally in English used to usually air in their original language on free-to-air television.

Since the late 1990s/early 2000s, however, more originally English-language programs that air on major free-to-air networks (i.e. 5, ABS-CBN, GMA) have been dubbed into Filipino. Even the former Studio 23 (now S+A), once known for its airing programs in English, had adopted Filipino language dubbing for some of its foreign programs. Children's programs from cable networks Nickelodeon, Cartoon Network, and Disney Channel shown on 5, GMA, or ABS-CBN, have long been dubbed into Filipino or another Philippine regional language. Animated Disney films are often dubbed in Filipino except for the singing scenes, which are shown in their original language (though in recent years, there has been an increase in number of Disney musicals having their songs also translated such as Frozen). GMA News TV airs some documentaries, movies, and reality series originally shown in the English language as dubbed in Filipino.

Dubbing is less common in smaller free-to-air networks such as ETC and the former RPN 9 (now CNN Philippines) whereby the original-language version of the program is aired. Dramas from Asia and Latin America have always been dubbed into Filipino or another Philippine regional language, and each program from these genres feature their unique set of Filipino-speaking voice actors.

Pay TV
The original language-version of TV programs is also usually available on cable/satellite channels such as Fox Life, Fox, and AXN. However, some pay-TV channels specialize in showing foreign shows and films dubbed into Filipino. Cinema One, ABS-CBN's cable movie channel, shows some films originally in non-English language dubbed into Filipino. Nat Geo Wild airs most programs dubbed into Filipino for Philippine audiences, being one of the few cable channels to do so. Tagalized Movie Channel and Tag airs Hollywood and Asian movies dubbed in Filipino. Fox Filipino airs some English, Latin, and Asian series dubbed in Filipino such as The Walking Dead, Devious Maids, La Teniente, Kdabra, and some selected programs from Channel M. The defunct channel HERO TV, which focused on anime series, dubbed all its foreign programs into Filipino. This was in contrast to Animax, where their anime programs are dubbed in English.

Cinema
Foreign films, especially English films shown in local cinemas, are almost always shown in their original language. Non-English foreign films make use of English subtitles. Unlike other countries, children's films originally in English are not dubbed in cinemas.

A list of voice actors with their associates that they dub into Filipino are listed here.

Singapore
In multilingual Singapore, dubbing is rare for western programs. English-language programs on the free-to-air terrestrial channels are usually subtitled in Chinese or Malay. Chinese, Malay and Tamil programs (except for news bulletins), usually have subtitles in English and the original language during the prime time hours. Dual sound programs, such as Korean and Japanese dramas, offer sound in the original languages with subtitles, Mandarin-dubbed and subtitled, or English-dubbed. The deliberate policy to encourage Mandarin among citizens made it required by law for programs in other Chinese dialects (Hokkien, Cantonese and Teochew) to be dubbed into Mandarin, with the exception of traditional operas. Cantonese and Hokkien shows from Hong Kong and Taiwan, respectively, are available on VCD and DVD. In a recent development, news bulletins are subtitled.

South Korea
In South Korea, anime that are imported from Japan are generally shown dubbed in Korean on television. However, some anime is censored, such as Japanese letters or content being edited for a suitable Korean audience. Western cartoons are dubbed in Korean as well, such as Nickelodeon cartoons like SpongeBob SquarePants and Danny Phantom. Several English-language (mostly American) live-action films are dubbed in Korean, but they are not shown in theaters. Instead they are only broadcast on South Korean television networks (KBS, MBC, SBS, EBS), while DVD import releases of these films are shown with Korean subtitles, such as The Wizard of Oz, Mary Poppins, the Star Wars films, and Avatar. This may be due to the fact that the six American major film studios may not own any rights to the Korean dubs of their live-action films that the Korean television networks have dubbed and aired. Even if they don't own the rights, Korean or non-Korean viewers can record from Korean-dubbed live-action films from television broadcasting onto DVDs with DVRs.

Sometimes, video games are dubbed in Korean. Examples would be the Halo series, the Jak & Daxter series, and the God of War series. For the Halo games, Lee Jeong Gu provides his Korean voice to the main protagonist Master Chief (replacing Steve Downes's voice), while Kim So Hyeong voices Chieftain Tartarus, one of the main antagonists (replacing Kevin Michael Richardson's voice).

The following South Korean voice-over artists are usually identified with the following actors:

Thailand
In Thailand, foreign television programs are dubbed in Thai, but the original soundtrack is often simultaneously carried on a NICAM audio track on terrestrial broadcast, and alternate audio tracks on satellite broadcast. Previously, terrestrial stations simulcasted the original soundtrack on the radio. On pay-TV, many channels carry foreign-language movies and television programs with subtitles. Movie theaters in Bangkok and some larger cities show both the subtitled version and the dubbed version of English-language movies. In big cities like Bangkok, Thai-language movies have English subtitles. 

This list features a collection of Thai voice actors and actresses that have dubbed for these featured performers.

Vietnam
In Vietnam, foreign-language films and programs are often subtitled or voice-overed on television in Vietnamese. They were not dubbed until 1985, but are briefly translated with a speaker before commercial breaks. Rio was considered to be the very first American Hollywood film to be entirely dubbed in Vietnamese. Since then, children's films that came out afterwards have been released dubbed in theaters. HTV3 has dubbed television programs for children, including Ben 10, and Ned's Declassified School Survival Guide, by using various voice actors to dub over the character roles.

Sooner afterwards, more programs started to get dubbed. HTV3 also offers anime dubbed into Vietnamese. Pokémon got a Vietnamese dub in early 2014 on HTV3 starting with the Best Wishes series. But due to a controversy regarding Pokémon's cries being re-dubbed despite that all characters had their Japanese names, it was switched to VTV2 in September 2015 when the XY series debut. Sailor Moon also recently has been dubbed for HTV3 in early 2015.

Also dubbed into Vietnamese are most films and TV series produced in Asia-Pacific countries such as China, Japan, etc.

Europe

Kids/family films and programming
In North-West Europe, Poland, Portugal, Balkan, Baltic and Nordic countries, generally only movies and TV shows intended for children are dubbed, while TV shows and movies for older audiences are subtitled (although animated productions have a tradition of being dubbed). For movies in cinemas with clear target audiences (both below and above 10–11 years of age), both a dubbed and a subtitled version are usually available.

Belgium
In the Dutch-speaking part of Belgium (Flanders), movies and TV series are shown in their original language with subtitles, with the exception of most movies made for a young audience. In the latter case, sometimes separate versions are recorded in the Netherlands and in Flanders (for instance, several Walt Disney films and Harry Potter films). These dubbed versions only differ from each other in their use of different voice actors and different pronunciation, while the text is almost the same.

In the French-speaking part of Belgium (Wallonia), the range of French-dubbed versions is approximately as wide as the German range, where nearly all movies and TV series are dubbed.

Bosnia and Herzegovina
Bosnia and Herzegovina usually uses Serbian and Croatian dubs (due to their mutual intelligibility), but they have dubbed some cartoons in Bosnian by themselves, for example My Little Pony: Friendship Is Magic. Children's programs (both animated and live-action) are airing dubbed (in Serbian, Croatian or Bosnian), while every other program is subtitled (in Bosnian).

Bulgaria
After November 10, 1991, there was a large-scale influx of American animation production in Bulgaria, which can be classified as follows: 
A/ Films that in the years of the Iron Curtain either did not reach Bulgaria or were not dubbed according to the generally accepted world standard. For example: Sleeping Beauty /1959/, One Hundred and One Dalmatians /1961/, Jungle Book /1967/, The Aristocats /1970/, Robin Hood /1973/ and many others entered the Bulgarian market after 1991.
B/ New first-run films created after 1991: Ice Age, Toy Story, Tangled, The Lion King, Mulan, etc.
After 1991, BNT was the first to obtain the rights to voice and broadcast Disney series - 101 Dalmatians, Woody Woodpecker, Mickey Mouse, Tom and Jerry, etc. The first full-length animated films were dubbed at Boyana Film Studio, Dolly Media Studio (1992) and Ars Digital Studio (1994). In 1999, Alexandra Audio Studio took over the Disney production from BNT, which lost the rights to do the voice-overs due to a highly outdated technology park. In 2019 Andarta Studio joined the sound business, and in 2005 Profilms Studio, which are still working.
In Bulgaria, there are two forms of Bulgarian dubbing. The first is the so-called "voiceover" dubbing, typical of the Bulgarian television market, in which the voice-over is based on the back-camera technology of the 1970s, with the voice superimposed on the original phonogram. This inexpensive way of voice-over is preferred only because of its low cost. But unfortunately it is a rather outdated technological form that does not meet the technical requirements of the new times. The second, considered basic in many European countries and the only one acceptable today, is synchronous dubbing, a radically different technology with much higher sound quality and speech synchronisation capabilities. This new method is defined as post-synchronous /non-synchronous/ dubbing of the product, in which the dialogue component of the phonogram is completely produced in Bulgarian, similar to the process in film production, in order for it to completely replace the original. In this sense, dubbing is considered by the production companies as one of the final elements of the overall post-production process of their films, and therefore their control over all the activities performed is complete.

Croatia
In Croatia, foreign films and TV series are always subtitled, while most children's programs and animated movies are dubbed into Croatian. The practice of dubbing began in the 1980s in some animated shows and continued in 90's, 00's and forward in other shows and films, the latter ones being released in home media. Recently, more efforts have been made to introduce dubbing, but public reception has been poor in some exceptions. Regardless of language, Croatian audiences prefer subtitling to dubbing, however it is still popular in animated films. Some previously popular shows (such as Sailor Moon) lost their appeal completely after the practice of dubbing began, and the dubbing was eventually removed from the programs, even though most animated shows shown on television and some on home media have been well received by people watching dubbed versions of them. This situation is similar with theater movies, with only those intended for children being dubbed. Also, there has been an effort to impose dubbing by Nova TV, with La Fea Más Bella translated as Ružna ljepotica (literally, "The Ugly Beauty"), a Mexican telenovela, but it failed. Some of Croatian dubbing is also broadcast in Bosnia and Herzegovina.

Estonia
In Estonia, only foreign children's films are dubbed in cinemas and on Estonian broadcast TV channels. As a rule, all other foreign films are shown with their original "pure" language soundtrack along with subtitles. On TV, the subtitles are almost always available in the Estonian language by default settings, and sometimes also in Russian and English upon request. In the cinemas, the subtitles are usually presented in Estonian and Russian languages. Cartoons and animated series are voiced by dubbing or voiceover. Estonian-language television channels use subtitles for English, Russian, and other foreign language audio. However, Russian-language TV channels tend to use dubbing more often, since most of them are produced and broadcast from Russia (as opposed to the few Russian-language channels broadcast from Estonia).

Greece
In Greece, most cartoon films have dubs. Usually when a movie has a Greek dub the dub is shown in cinemas but subtitled versions are shown as well. Foreign TV shows for adults are shown in their original versions with subtitles, most cartoons, for example, The Flintstones and The Jetsons were always dubbed, while Family Guy and American Dad! are always subtitled and contain the original English dialogue, since they are mostly for adults rather than children, also some Japanese anime series are dubbed in Greek (such as Pokémon, Dragon Ball, Digimon, Pichi Pichi Pitch, Sailor Moon, Candy Candy etc.) The only television programs dubbed in Greek includes Mexican TV series (like Rubí and La usurpadora). However, when Skai TV was re-launched in April 2006, the network opted for dubbing almost all foreign shows in Greek, unlike other Greek channels which had always broadcast most of the programs in their original language with subtitles.

Ireland
Ireland usually receives the same film versions as the UK. However some films have been dubbed into Irish by TG4.
Children's cartoons on TV are also occasionally dubbed into Irish.

Netherlands
In the Netherlands, for the most part, Dutch versions are only made for children's and family films. Animated movies are shown in theaters with Dutch subtitles or dubbing, but usually those cinemas with more screening rooms also provide the original subtitled version.

Nordic countries
In the Nordic countries, dubbing is used only in animated features (except adult animated features which only use subtitles) and other films for younger audiences. Some cinemas in the major cities may also screen the original version, usually as the last showing of the day, or in a smaller auditorium in a multiplex.

In television programs with off-screen narration, both the original audio and on-screen voices are usually subtitled in their native languages.

The Nordic countries are often treated as a common market issuing DVD and Blu-ray releases with original audio and user choosable subtitle options in Danish, Finnish, Norwegian and Swedish. The covers often have text in all four languages as well, but are sometimes unique for each country. Some releases may include other European language audio and/or subtitles (i.e. German, Greek, Hungarian or Italian). as well as original audio in most cases.

In Finland, the dubbed version from Sweden may also be available at certain cinemas for children of the 5% Swedish-speaking minority, but only in cities or towns with a significant percentage of Swedish speakers. Most DVD and Blu-ray releases usually only have the original audio, except for animated television series telenovelas, which have both Finnish and Swedish language tracks, in addition to the original audio and subtitles in both languages.

In Finnish movie theaters, films for adult audiences have both Finnish and Swedish subtitles, the Finnish printed in basic font and the Swedish printed below the Finnish in a cursive font. In the early ages of television, foreign TV shows and movies were voiced by narrator in Finland. Later, Finnish subtitles became a practice on Finnish television. As in many other countries, dubbing is not preferred outside of children's programs. A good example of this is The Simpsons Movie. While the original version was well-received, the Finnish-dubbed version received poor reviews, with some critics even calling it a disaster. On the other hand, many dubs of Disney's animated television series and movies have been well-received, both critically and by the public.

In Iceland, the dubbed version of film and TV was originally Danish with some translated into Icelandic but Icelandic has taken over. LazyTown, an Icelandic TV show originally broadcast in English, was dubbed into Icelandic, amongst thirty-two other languages.

North Macedonia
North Macedonia dubbed many cartoons in Macedonian, but they also air some Serbian dubs. Children's programs are airing dubbed (in Macedonian or Serbian), while every other program is subtitled (in Macedonian). They use Serbian dubs for Disney movies, because there are no Macedonian Disney dubs.

Portugal
In Portugal, dubbing was banned under a 1948 law as a way of protecting the domestic film industry and reducing access to culture as most of the population was illiterate. Until 1994, animated movies, as well as other TV series for children, were shown subtitled in Portugal along with imported Brazilian Portuguese dubs due to the lack of interest from Portuguese companies in the dubbing industry. This lack of interest was justified, since there were already quality dubbed copies of shows and movies in Portuguese made by Brazilians. The Lion King was the first feature film to be dubbed in European Portuguese rather than strictly Brazilian Portuguese. Currently, all movies for children are dubbed in European Portuguese. Subtitles are preferred in Portugal, used in every foreign-language documentary, TV series and film. The exception to this preference is when children are the target audience.

While on TV, children's shows and movies are always dubbed, in cinemas, films with a clear juvenile target can be found in two versions, one dubbed (identified by the letters V.P. for versão portuguesa - "Portuguese version") and another subtitled version (V.O. for versão original - "original version"). This duality applies only to juvenile films. Others use subtitles only. While the quality of these dubs is recognized (some have already received international recognition and prizes), original versions with subtitles are usually preferred by the adults. Presently, live action series and movies are always shown in their original language format with Portuguese subtitles. Streaming services also offer some content for adults dubbed in European Portuguese, although there they provide an option to select the original language. There are also a few examples of Anime who were dubbed in European Portuguese (i.e. Dragon Ball and Naruto) Netflix is now offering foreign language films aimed at older audiences and TV series (M/12, M/14 and M/16) dubbed into European Portuguese in addition to offering the original version with subtitles.

Romania

In Romania, virtually all programs intended for children are dubbed in Romanian. Animated movies are shown in theaters with Romanian dubbing. However, cinemas with more screening rooms usually also provide the original subtitled version. Other foreign TV shows and movies are shown in the original language with Romanian subtitles. Subtitles are usually preferred in the Romanian market. According to "Special Eurobarometer 243" (graph QA11.8) of the European Commission (research carried out in November and December 2005), 62% of Romanians prefer to watch foreign films and programs with subtitles (rather than dubbed), 22% prefer dubbing, and 16% declined to answer. This is led by the assumption that watching movies in their original versions is very useful for learning foreign languages. However, according to the same Eurobarometer, virtually no Romanian found this method—watching movies in their original version—to be the most efficient way to learn foreign languages, compared to 53 percent who preferred language lessons at school.

Some programmes that are broadcast on The Fishing & Hunting Channel are subtitled. TV Paprika used to broadcast voice-overed programmes, but it was replaced with subtitles.
Some promos for films shown on TV 1000 use voice-overs; but the films are subtitled. Examples shown here, at 2:11, 4:25, 5:09 and 7:15

Serbia
Serbian language dubs are made mainly for Serbia, but they broadcast in Montenegro and Bosnia and Herzegovina, too. Children's animated and some live-action movies and TV series are dubbed into Serbian, while live-action films and TV series for adults are always airing subtitled, because in this region people prefer subtitling for live-action formats. Turkish soap opera Lale Devri started airing dubbed in 2011, on RTV Pink, but because of bad reception, dub failed and rest of TV series was aired subtitled.

The dubbing of cartoon series in former Yugoslavia during the 1980s had a twist of its own: famous Serbian actors, such as Nikola Simić, Mića Tatić, Nada Blam and others provided the voices for characters of Disney, Warner Bros., MGM and other companies, frequently using region-specific phrases and sentences and, thus, adding a dose of local humor to the translation of the original lines. These phrases became immensely popular and are still being used for tongue-in-cheek comments in specific situations. These dubs are today considered cult dubs. The only dub made after 1980s and 1990s ones that's considered cult is SpongeBob SquarePants dub, made by B92 in period 2002–2017, because of a great popularity and memorable translation with local humor phrases, such as 1980s dubs translation.

Some Serbian dubs are also broadcast in North Macedonia, while cult dubs made during Yugoslavia were aired all over the country (today's Croatia, Bosnia and Herzegovina, Montenegro, Slovenia, North Macedonia and Serbia).

In the 21st-century, prominent dubbing/voice actors in Serbia include actors Marko Marković, Vladislava Đorđević, Jelena Gavrilović, Dragan Vujić, Milan Antonić, Boris Milivojević, Radovan Vujović, Goran Jevtić, Ivan Bosiljčić, Gordan Kičić, Slobodan Stefanović, Dubravko Jovanović, Dragan Mićanović, Slobodan Ninković, Branislav Lečić, Jakov Jevtović, Ivan Jevtović, Katarina Žutić, Anica Dobra, Voja Brajović, Nebojša Glogovac and Dejan Lutkić.

Slovenia
In Slovenia, all foreign films and television programs are subtitled with the exception of children's movies and TV shows (both animated or live-action). While dubbed versions are always shown in cinemas and later on TV channels, cinemas will sometimes play subtitled versions of children's movies as well.

United Kingdom
In the United Kingdom, the vast majority of foreign language films are subtitled, although mostly animated films are dubbed in English. These usually originate from North America, as opposed to being dubbed locally. Foreign language serials shown on BBC Four are subtitled into English (although open subtitles are dropped during dialogues with English language segments already). There have, however, been notable examples of films and TV programs successfully dubbed in the UK, such as the Japanese Monkey and French Magic Roundabout series. When airing films on television, channels in the UK often choose subtitling over dubbing, even if a dubbing in English exists. It is also a fairly common practice for animation aimed at preschool children to be re-dubbed with British voice actors replacing the original voices, such as Spin Master Entertainment's PAW Patrol series, although this is not done with shows aimed at older audiences. The off-screen narrated portions of some programs and reality shows that originate from North America are also redone with British English voices. The 2020 Bavarian show on Netflix, Freud, has also been dubbed to English.

Some animated films and TV programs are also dubbed into Welsh and Scottish Gaelic.

Hinterland displays a not so common example of a bilingual production. Each scene is filmed twice, in the English and Welsh languages, apart from a few scenes where Welsh with subtitles is used for the English version.

General films and programming
In the French-, Italian-, Spanish-, German-, Russian-, Polish-, Czech-, Slovak- and Hungarian-speaking markets of Europe, almost all foreign films and television shows are dubbed (with the main exception being the majority of theatrical releases of adult-audience movies in the Czech Republic and Slovakia). There are few opportunities to watch foreign movies in their original versions. In Spain, Italy, Germany and Austria, even in the largest cities, there are few cinemas that screen original versions with subtitles, or without any translation. However, digital pay-TV programming is often available in the original language, including the latest movies. Prior to the rise of DVDs (and later Video on Demand and Streaming), which in these countries are mostly issued with multi-language audio tracks, original-language films (those in languages other than the country's official language) were rare, whether in theaters, on TV, or on home video, and subtitled versions were considered a product for small niche markets such as intellectual or art films.

Albania
The first movie dubbed in Albanian was The Great Warrior Skanderbeg in 1954 and since then, there have been thousands of popular titles dubbed in Albanian by different dubbing studios. All animated movies and children's programs are dubbed into Albanian (though typically, songs are left in English or the original language of the program with Albanian subtitles). Many live-action movies are dubbed as well. TV series nevertheless are usually not dubbed, they are subtitled except for a few Mexican, Brazilian and Turkish soap operas, like: Por Ti, Celebridade, A Casa das Sete Mulheres, Paramparça, etc. As for documentaries, Albania usually uses voice-over.

France
In France, dubbing is the norm. Most movies with a theatrical release, including all those from major distributors, are dubbed. Those that are not, are foreign independent films whose budget for international distribution is limited, or foreign art films with a niche audience.

Almost all theaters show movies with their French dubbing ("VF", short for ). Some of them also offer screenings in the original language ("VO", short for ), generally accompanied with French subtitles ("VOST", short for ). A minority of theaters (usually small ones) screen exclusively in the original language. According to the CNC (National Centre for Cinematography), VOST screenings accounted for 16.4% of tickets sold in France.

In addition, dubbing is required for home entertainment and television screenings. However, since the advent of digital television, foreign programs are broadcast to television viewers in both languages (sometimes, French with audio description is also aired); while the French-language track is selected by default, viewers can switch to the original-language track and enable French subtitles. As a special case, the binational television channel Arte broadcasts both the French and German dubbing, in addition to the original-language version.

Some voice actors that have dubbed for celebrities in the European French language are listed below.

Germany, Austria, Switzerland
The Germanophone dubbing market is the largest in Europe. Germany has the most foreign-movie-dubbing studios per capita and per given area in the world and according to the German newspaper Die Welt 52% of all voice actors currently work in the German dubbing industry. In Germany and Austria, practically all films, shows, television series and foreign soap operas are shown in dubbed versions created for the German market. Dubbing films is a traditional and common practice in German-speaking Europe, since subtitles are not accepted and used as much as in other European countries. According to a European study, Austria is the country with the highest rejection rate (more than 70 percent) of subtitles, followed by Italy, Spain and Germany.
In German-speaking markets, computer and video games feature German text menus and are generally dubbed into the German language if speaking parts exist.

Unlike in Austria and Germany, cinemas in German-speaking Switzerland historically strongly preferred subtitled versions of foreign-language films. Swiss film distributors commissioned dual-language prints with both German and French subtitles as the primary version, with the dubbed version also shown. In recent years, however, there has been a shift towards dubbed versions, which now account for the majority of showings. Television broadcasts of foreign films and programming have historically been dubbed.

Swiss and Austrian television stations have increasingly been broadcasting foreign-language movies and TV programs with multiple soundtracks, allowing the viewer to choose between the original language (e.g. English) and the channel's local language (German, French, or Italian, according to the location).

Although German-speaking voice actors play only a secondary role, they are still notable for providing familiar voices to well-known actors. Famous foreign actors are known and recognized for their German voice, and the German audience is used to them, so dubbing is also a matter of authenticity. However, in larger cities, there are theaters where movies can be seen in their original versions, as English has become somewhat more popular among young educated viewers. On German mainstream television, films are never broadcast with subtitles, but pay-per-view programming is often available in the original language. Subtitled niche and art films are sometimes aired on smaller networks.

German-dubbed versions sometimes diverge greatly from the original, especially in adding humorous elements absent from the original. In extreme cases, such as The Persuaders! or Erik the Viking, the German-dubbed version was more successful than the English original. Often, translation adds sexually explicit gags the U.S. versions might not be allowed to use. For example, in Bewitched, the translators changed "The Do Not Disturb sign will hang on the door tonight" to "The only hanging thing tonight will be the Do Not Disturb sign". This practice was the most prevalent from the 1960s to 80s, from the 1990s onwards it became much less common.

Some movies dubbed in Austria diverge from the German Standard version in addressing other people but only when the movies are dubbed into certain Austrian dialect versions. (Mr. and Mrs. are translated into Herr and Frau which is usually not translated in order to be in lip-sync).
Sometimes even English pronounced first names are translated and are pronounced into the correct German equivalent (English name "Bert" became Southern German pronounced name "Bertl" which is an abbreviation for any name either beginning or even ending with "bert", e.g. "Berthold" or "Albert".)

Some movies dubbed before reunification exist in different versions for the east and the west. They use different translations, and often differ in the style of dubbing.

Some of the well-known German dubbing voice artists are listed below.

Hungary

In Hungary, dubbing is almost universally common. Almost every foreign movie or TV show released in Hungary is dubbed into Hungarian. The history of dubbing dates back to the 1950s, when the country was still under communist rule. One of the most iconic Hungarian dubs was of the American cartoon The Flintstones, with a local translation by József Romhányi. The Internetes Szinkron Adatbázis (ISzDB) is the largest Hungarian database for film dubs, with information for many live action and animated films. On page 59 of the Eurobarometer, 84% of Hungarians said that they prefer dubbing over subtitles.

In the socialist era, every film was dubbed with professional and mostly popular actors. Care was taken to make sure the same voice actor would lend their voice to the same original actor. In the early 1990s, as cinemas tried to keep up with showing newly-released films, subtitling became dominant in the cinema. This, in turn, forced TV channels to make their own cheap versions of dubbed soundtracks for the movies they presented, resulting in a constant degrading of dubbing quality. Once this became customary, cinema distributors resumed the habit of dubbing for popular productions, presenting them in a below-average quality. However, every feature is presented with the original soundtrack in at least one cinema in large towns and cities.

However, in Hungary, most documentary films and series (for example, those on Discovery Channel, National Geographic Channel) are made with voiceovers, as is the case with most other countries that favor dubbing. Some old movies and series, or ones that provide non-translatable jokes and conversations (for example, the Mr. Bean television series), are shown only with subtitles.

There is a more recent problem arising from dubbing included on DVD releases. Many generations have grown up with an original (and, by current technological standards, outdated) soundtrack, which is either technologically (mono or bad quality stereo sound) or legally (expired soundtrack license) unsuitable for a DVD release. Many original features are released on DVD with a new soundtrack, which in some cases proves to be extremely unpopular, thus forcing DVD producers to include the original soundtrack. In some rare cases, the Hungarian soundtrack is left out altogether. This happens notably with Warner Home Video Hungary, which ignored the existence of Hungarian soundtracks completely, as they did not want to pay the licenses for the soundtracks to be included on their new DVD releases, which appear with improved picture quality, but very poor subtitling.

Italy
Dubbing is systematic in Italy, with a tradition going back to 1930. In Mussolini's fascist Italy, the release of movies in foreign languages was banned in 1938 for political reasons. Rome is the main base of the dubbing industry, where major productions, such as movies, drama, documentaries, and some animation films are dubbed. However, most animated works are dubbed in Milan, as well as other minor productions. Virtually every foreign film of every genre and target audience—as well as TV shows—are dubbed into Italian. Some theatres in the bigger cities include original language shows in their schedules, even if this is an uncommon practice. Subtitles may be available on late-night programs on mainstream TV channels. Pay-TV and streaming services provide films in the dubbed version as well as in their original language.

Early in their careers, actors such as Alberto Sordi or Nino Manfredi worked extensively as dubbing actors. At a certain point, shooting scenes in MOS (motor only sync or motor only shot) was a common practice in Italian cinema; all dialogue was dubbed in post-production. A notable instance is The Good, the Bad, and the Ugly, in which all actors had to dub in their own voices.

Because many films would feature multinational casts, dubbing became necessary to ensure dialogue would be comprehensible regardless of the dub language. The presence of foreign actors also meant that some directors would have actors recite gibberish or otherwise unrelated words, since the end goal was simply to have general lip movements over which to add dialogue.

A typical example of this practice was La Strada, which starred two Americans; Anthony Quinn and Richard Basehart, in leading roles. Rather than have dialogue spoken phonetically or have multiple languages at the same time (which would require lines to be translated multiple times), actors would instead count numbers corresponding to the number of lines. Liliana Betti, assistant to director Federico Fellini, described the system as such: "Instead of lines, the actor has to count off numbers in their normal order. For instance, a line of fifteen words equals an enumeration of up to thirty. The actor merely counts till thirty: 1-2-3-4-5-6-7. etc." Fellini used this system, which he coined "numerological diction," in many of his films. Other directors adopted similar systems.

Dubbing may also be used for artistic purposes. It was common for even Italian-speaking performers to have their dialogue dubbed by separate voice actors, if their actual voice is thought to be unfitting or some otherwise unsuitable. For example, in Django, lead actor Franco Nero was dubbed by Nando Gazzolo because he was thought to sound too youthful for the grizzled character he portrayed. Claudia Cardinale, one of the major actresses of the 1960s and 70s, had a heavy accent from her Tunisian background, and was likewise dubbed for the first decade of her career. This practice was generally phased out in the 1990s, with the widespread adoption of sync sound.

Video games are generally either dubbed into Italian (for instance, the Assassin's Creed, Halo, and Harry Potter series) or released with the original audio tracks providing Italian subtitles.

As for documentaries, Italy usually uses voice-over.

The most important Italian voice actors and actresses, as well as the main celebrities dubbed in their career, are listed below.

Latvia, Lithuania
In Latvia and Lithuania, only children's movies get dubbed in the cinema, while many live-action movies for an older audience use voice-over. Most children's TV shows, like SpongeBob SquarePants, use voice-over, but in recent years, a few of them, mainly aimed at preschoolers, have been dubbed into Latvian and Lithuanian.

Poland

In Poland, cinema releases for general audiences are almost exclusively subtitled, with the exception of children's movies, home media releases and television screenings of movies, as well as made-for-TV shows. These are usually shown with voice-over translation, where a voice talent reads a translation over the original soundtrack. This method is similar to the so-called Gavrilov translation in Russia, with one difference—all dialogues are voiced by one off-screen reader, preferably with a deep and neutral voice which does not interfere with the pitch of voice of the original speakers in the background. To some extent, it resembles live translation. Certain highly qualified voice talents are traditionally assigned to particular kinds of production, such as action or drama. Standard dubbing is not widely popular with most audiences, with the exception of cartoons and children's shows, which are dubbed also for TV releases.

It is claimed that, until around 1951, there were no revoiced foreign movies available in Poland. Instead, they were exclusively subtitled in Polish.

Poland's dubbing traditions began between the two world wars. In 1931, among the first movies dubbed into Polish were Dangerous Curves (1929), The Dance of Life (1929), Paramount on Parade (1930), and Darling of the Gods (1930). In 1949, the first dubbing studio opened in Łódź. The first film dubbed that year was Russkiy Vopros (filmed 1948).

Polish dubbing in the first post-war years suffered from poor synchronization. Polish dialogues were not always audible and the cinema equipment of that time often made films sound less clear than they were. In the 1950s, Polish publicists discussed the quality of Polish versions of foreign movies.

The number of dubbed movies and the quality improved. Polish dubbing had a golden age between the 1960s and the 1980s. Approximately a third of foreign movies screened in cinemas were dubbed. The "Polish dubbing school" was known for its high quality. In that time, Poland had some of the best dubbing in the world. The person who initiated high-quality dubbing versions was director Zofia Dybowska-Aleksandrowicz. In that time, dubbing in Poland was very popular. Polish television dubbed popular films and TV series such as Rich Man, Poor Man; Fawlty Towers, Forsyte Saga, Elizabeth R, I, Claudius, I'll Take Manhattan, and Peter the Great.

In the 1980s, due to budget cuts, state-run TV saved on tapes by voicing films over live during transmission.

Overall, during 1948–1998, almost 1,000 films were dubbed in Polish. In the 1990s, dubbing films and TV series continued, although often also for one emission only.

In 1995, Canal+ was launched in Poland. In its first years, it dubbed 30% of its schedule dubbing popular films and TV series, one of the best-known and popular dubbings was that of Friends, but this proved unsuccessful. It stopped dubbing films in 1999, although many people supported the idea of dubbing and bought the access only for dubbing versions of foreign productions. In the 1990s, dubbing was done by the television channel known as Wizja Jeden. They mainly dubbed BBC productions such as The League of Gentlemen, Absolutely Fabulous and Men Behaving Badly. Wizja Jeden was closed in 2001. In the same year, TVP stopped dubbing the TV series Frasier, although that dubbing was very popular.

Currently, dubbing of films and TV series for teenagers is made by Nickelodeon and Disney Channel. One of the major breakthroughs in dubbing was the Polish release of Shrek, which contained many references to local culture and Polish humor. Since then, people seem to have grown to like dubbed versions more, and pay more attention to the dubbing actors. However, this seems to be the case only with animated films, as live-action dubbing is still considered a bad practice. In the case of DVD releases, most discs contain both the original soundtrack and subtitles, and either voice over or dubbed Polish track. The dubbed version is, in most cases, the one from the theater release, while voice-over is provided for movies that were only subtitled in theaters.

Since the theatrical release of The Avengers in May 2012, Walt Disney Company Polska dubs all films for cinema releases. Also in 2012, United International Pictures Polska dubbed The Amazing Spider-Man, while Forum Film Polska – former distributor of Disney's films – decided to dub The Hobbit: An Unexpected Journey, along with its two sequels. However, when a dub is produced but the film's target audience is not exclusively children, both dubbed and subtitled versions are usually available in movie theaters. The dubbed versions are more commonly shown in morning and early afternoon hours, with the subtitled version dominating in the evening. Both can be available in parallel at similar hours in multiplexes.

Russia
Russian television is generally dubbed, but often uses the voice-over translation method with only a couple of voice actors, with the original speech still audible underneath. In the Soviet Union, most foreign movies to be officially released were dubbed. Voice-over dub was invented in the Soviet Union in the 1980s when with the fall of the regime, many popular foreign movies, previously forbidden, or at least questionable under communist rule, started to flood in, in the form of low-quality home-copied videos. Being unofficial releases, they were dubbed in a very primitive way. For example, the translator spoke the text directly over the audio of a video being copied, using primitive equipment. The quality of the resulting dub was very low: The translated phrases were off-sync (interfering with the original voices), background sounds leaked into the track, the translation was inaccurate, and, most importantly, all dub voices were made by a single person who usually lacked the intonation of the original, making comprehension of some scenes quite difficult. This method of translation exerted a strong influence on Russian pop culture. Voices of translators became recognizable for generations.

In modern Russia, the overdubbing technique is still used in many cases, although with vastly improved quality, and now with multiple voice actors dubbing different original voices. Video games are generally either dubbed into Russian (such as the Legend of Spyro trilogy, the Skylanders series, the Assassin's Creed saga, the Halo series, the Harry Potter series, etc.) or released with original-speaking tracks but with all the texts translated into Russian language. The technique of non-voiceover dubbing, without the original speech still audible underneath, has also gained traction in Russia in the 21st century.

Releases of films in cinemas are almost always dubbed in the Russian language. Television series are typically shown as a dubbed or voiceovered translation. Subtitles are rarely used.

Some of the well-known Russian dubbing voice artists are listed below.

Slovakia
In Slovakia, home media market, Czech dubbed versions are widely used, with only children's films and some few exceptions (for example Independence Day) that have been dubbed for cinema being released with Slovak dubbing. Czech dubbing was also extensively used in the broadcast of Slovak television channels, but since 2008 Slovak language laws require any newer shows (understood as the first television broadcast in Slovakia) to be provided with Slovak localization (dubbing or subtitles); since then, television broadcasts of films, TV series and cartoons have been dubbed into Slovak.

Theatrical releases are generally subtitled, except for films with a young target audience.

Spain
In Spain, practically all foreign television programs are shown dubbed in European Spanish, as are most films. Some dubbing actors have achieved popularity for their voices, such as Constantino Romero (who dubs Clint Eastwood, Darth Vader and Arnold Schwarzenegger's Terminator, among others) and Óscar Muñoz (the official European Spanish dub-over voice artist for Elijah Wood and Hayden Christensen). Currently, with the spread of digital terrestrial television, viewers can choose between the original and the dubbed soundtracks for most movies and television.

In some communities such as Catalonia, Galicia and Basque Country, some foreign programs are also often dubbed into Catalan, Galician, or Basque. Films from the Spanish-speaking America shown in these communities are shown in their original language, while strong regional accents (from the Spanish-speaking America or from Spain) may be dubbed in news and documentaries.

Ukraine

In Ukraine, since 2006 cinema releases are almost always dubbed into Ukrainian with the overdubbing technique and multiple voice actors dubbing different original voices with a small percent of art-house/documentaries shown in the original language with Ukrainian subtitles. For television, TV channels usually release movies and TV-shows with a Ukrainian voiceover, although certain high-profile films and TV shows are dubbed rather than voice-overed.

In the past Russian-language films, TV series, cartoons, animated series and TV programs were usually not dubbed but were shown with the original audio with Ukrainian subtitles. However, this practice has been slowly abandoned since the late 2010s: all children's films and cartoons regardless of the original language (including Russian) are always dubbed into Ukrainian; example of the first Russian cartoons dubbed into Ukrainian for the cinematic-release is The Snow Queen 2 (2015), A Warrior's Tail (2015), Volki i Ovtsy: Be-e-e-zumnoe prevrashenie (2016), Ivan Tsarevich i Seryy Volk 3 (2016), Bremenskie razboyniki (2016), The Snow Queen 3: Fire and Ice (2017), Fantastic Journey to OZ (2017), Fixies: Top Secret (2017) etc.; the same trend is seen among Russian language feature films for adults, with the first such films dubbed into Ukrainian including Battle for Sevastopol (2015), Hardcore Henry (2016), The Duelist (2016).

Latin America

Brazil
In Brazil, foreign programs are invariably dubbed into Brazilian Portuguese on free-to-air TV, with only a few exceptions. Films shown at cinemas are generally offered with both subtitled and dubbed versions, with dubbing frequently being the only choice for children's movies. Subtitling was primarily for adult audience movies until 2012. Since then, dubbed versions also became available for all ages. As a result, in recent years, more cinemas have opened in Brazil, attracting new audiences to the cinema who prefer dubbing. According to a Datafolha survey, 56% of Brazilian movie theaters' audience prefer to watch dubbed movies. Most of the dubbing studios in Brazil are in the cities of Rio de Janeiro and São Paulo.

The first film to be dubbed in Brazil was the Disney animation "Snow White and the Seven Dwarfs" in 1938. By the end of the 1950s, most of the movies, TV series and cartoons on television in Brazil were shown in its original sound and subtitles. However, in 1961, a decree of President Jânio Quadros ruled that all foreign productions on television should be dubbed. This measure boosted the growth of dubbing in Brazil, and has led to several dubbing studios since then. The biggest dubbing studio in Brazil was Herbert Richers, headquartered in Rio de Janeiro and closed in 2009, At its peak in the 80s and 90s, the Herbert Richers studios dubbed about 70% of the productions shown in Brazilian cinemas.

In the 90s, with Saint Seiya, Dragon Ball and other anime shows becoming popular in Brazilian TVs, the voice actors and the dubbing career gained a higher space in Brazilian culture. Actors like Hermes Baroli (Brazilian dubber of Pegasus Seiya, in Saint Seiya and actors like Ashton Kutcher), Marco Ribeiro (Brazilian dubber of many actors like Tom Hanks, Jim Carrey and Robert Downey Jr., and Yusuke Urameshi from the anime Yu Yu Hakusho) and Wendel Bezerra (Brazilian dubber of Goku in Dragon Ball Z and SpongeBob in SpongeBob SquarePants) are recognized for their most notable roles.

Pay TV commonly offers both dubbed and subtitled movies, with statistics showing that dubbed versions are becoming predominant. Most DVD and Blu-ray releases usually feature Portuguese, Spanish, and the original audio along with subtitles in native languages. Most video games are dubbed in Brazilian Portuguese rather than having European Portuguese dubs alone. Games such as Halo 3, God of War: Ascension, inFamous 2, Assassin's Creed III, Skylanders: Spyro's Adventure, World of Warcraft and others are dubbed in Brazilian Portuguese. This is because despite the dropping of the dubbing law in Portugal in 1994, most companies in that country use the Brazilian Portuguese because of traditional usage during the days of the dubbing rule, along with these dubbings being more marketable than European Portuguese.

A list that showcases Brazilian Portuguese voice artists that dub for actors and actresses are displayed here. However, there can also be different official dub artists for certain regions within Brazil.

Apparently, for unknown reasons (probably technical), the Brazilian Portuguese dub credits from some shows or cartoons from channels from Viacom or Turner/Time Warner, are shown on Latin America (on Spanish-dubbed series).

Mexico
In Mexico, by law, films shown in theaters must be shown in their original version. Films in languages other than Spanish are usually subtitled. Only educational documentaries and movies rated for children (some shows aired on PBS or PBS Kids), as well as some movies that are expected to have a wide audience (for example, The Lord of the Rings: The Return of the King or The Avengers) may be dubbed, but this is not compulsory, and some animated films are shown in theaters in both dubbed and subtitled versions (for instance, some DreamWorks productions). Nonetheless, a recent trend in several cinemas is to offer the dubbed versions only, with a stark decrease in the showing of the original ones.

Dubbing must be made in Mexico by Mexican nationals or foreigners residing in Mexico. Still, several programs that are shown on pay TV are dubbed in other countries like Argentina, Chile, Colombia and Venezuela.

Most movies released on DVD feature neutral Spanish as a language option, and sometimes feature a specific dub for Mexican audiences (for example, Rio). Foreign programs are dubbed on broadcast TV, while on pay TV most shows and movies are subtitled. In a similar way to cinemas, in the last few years many channels on pay TV have begun to broadcast programs and films only in their dubbed version.

Dubbing became very popular in the 1990s with the rise in popularity of anime in Mexico. Some voice actors have become celebrities and are always identified with specific characters, such as Mario Castañeda (who became popular by dubbing Goku in Dragon Ball Z) or Humberto Vélez (who dubbed Homer Simpson in the first 15 seasons of The Simpsons).

The popularity of pay TV has allowed people to view several series in their original language rather than dubbed. Dubbing has been criticized for the use of TV or movie stars as voice actors (such as Ricky Martin in Disney's Hercules, or Eugenio Derbez in DreamWorks' Shrek), or for the incorrect use of local popular culture that sometimes creates unintentional jokes or breaks the feeling of the original work (such as translating Sheldon Cooper's "Bazinga!" to "¡Vacilón!").

Several video games have been dubbed into neutral Spanish, rather than European Spanish, in Mexico (such as the Gears of War series, Halo 3, Infamous 2 and others). Sony recently announced that more games (such as God of War: Ascension) will be dubbed into neutral Spanish.

Peru
In Peru, all foreign series, movies, and animated programming are shown dubbed in Latin American Spanish, with dubs imported from Argentina, Mexico, Chile, Colombia and Venezuela on terrestrial and pay-television. Most movies intended for kids are being offered as dub-only movies, while most films aimed at older audiences are being offered dubbed and subtitled in Spanish. Also, at most theaters, kids films (on rare occasions) subtitled are commonly shown at nighttime. Most subtitled Pay-TV channels show both dubbed and subtitled version of every film they broadcast, being offered with a separate subtitle track and a second audio track in English. There is an increase of people preferring subtitle films and series rather than dubbed starting the late-2000s, as Peruvians viewers tend to get used to their original version.

Peru used to not produce their own dubs since dubbing studios never existed in that country until 2016, when the company "Big Bang Films" started to dub movies and series; however since 2014, a group of dubbing actors created a group called "Torre A Doblaje", which is a group of actors that gives dubbing and localization services.

Spanish-speaking countries
For Spanish-speaking countries, all foreign-language programs, films, cartoons and documentaries shown on free-to-air TV networks are dubbed into Standard Spanish, (mainly in Mexico, Venezuela or Argentina) while broadcasts on cable and satellite pan-regional channels (i.e. Discovery Kids) are either dubbed or subtitled. In theaters, children's movies and most blockbuster films are dubbed into Standard Spanish, and are sometimes further dubbed into regional dialects of Spanish where they are released.

North America

French-speaking Canada
In Quebec, Canada, most films and TV programs in English are dubbed into Standard French, occasionally with Quebec French idiosyncrasies. They speak with a mixed accent, they pronounce /ɛ̃/ with a Parisian accent, but they pronounce "â" and "ê" with a Quebec accent: grâce [ɡʁɑːs] and être [ɛːtʁ̥]. Occasionally, the dubbing of a series or a movie, such as The Simpsons, is made using the more widely spoken joual variety of Quebec French. Dubbing has the advantage of making children's films and TV series more comprehensible to younger audiences. However, many bilingual Québécois prefer subtitling, since they would understand some or all of the original audio. In addition, all films are shown in English, as well in certain theaters (especially in major cities and English-speaking areas such as the West Island), and some theatres, such as the Scotiabank Cinema Montreal, show only movies in English. Most American television series are only available in English on DVD, or on English-language channels, but some of the more popular ones have French dubs shown on mainstream networks, and are released in French on DVD as well, sometimes separately from an English-only version.

Formerly, all French-language dubbed films in Quebec were imported from France and some still are. Such a practice was criticized by former politician Mario Dumont after he took his children to see the Parisian French dub of Shrek the Third, which Dumont found incomprehensible. After his complaints and a proposed bill, Bee Movie, the film from DreamWorks Animation, was dubbed in Quebec, making it the studio's first animated film to have a Quebec French dub, as all DreamWorks Animation films had previously been dubbed in France. In terms of Disney, the first Disney animated film to be dubbed in Quebec was Oliver and Company. The Disney Renaissance films were also dubbed in Quebec except for The Rescuers Down Under, Beauty and the Beast, and The Lion King.

In addition, because Canadian viewers usually find Quebec French more comprehensible than other dialects of the language, some older film series that had the French-language versions of previous installments dubbed in France have had later ones dubbed in Quebec, often creating inconsistencies within the French version of the series' canon. Lucasfilm's Star Wars and Indiana Jones series are examples. Both series had films released in the 1970s and 1980s, with no Québécois French dubbed versions; instead, the Parisian French versions, with altered character and object names and terms, were distributed in the province. However, later films in both series released 1999 and later were dubbed in Quebec, using different voice actors and "reversing" name changes made in France's dubbings due to the change in studio.

United States and English-speaking Canada
In the United States and English-speaking Canada, live-action foreign films are usually shown in theaters with their original languages and English subtitles. It is because live-action dubbed movies rarely did well in United States box office since the 1980s. The 1982 United States theatrical release of Wolfgang Petersen's Das Boot was the last major release to go out in both original and English-dubbed versions, and the film's original version actually grossed much higher than the English-dubbed version. Later on, English-dubbed versions of international hits like Un indien dans la ville, Godzilla 2000, Anatomy, Pinocchio, The Return of Godzilla and High Tension flopped at United States box offices. When Miramax planned to release the English-dubbed versions of Shaolin Soccer and Hero in the United States cinemas, their English-dubbed versions scored badly in test screenings in the United States, so Miramax finally released the films in United States cinemas with their original language.
Still, English-dubbed movies have much better commercial potential in ancillary market; therefore, more distributors would release live-action foreign films in theaters with their original languages (with English subtitles), then release both original versions and English-dubbed versions in ancillary market.

On the other hand, anime is almost always released in English-dubbed format, regardless of its content or target age group. The exceptions to this practice are either when an English dub has not been produced for the program (usually in the case of feature films) or when the program is being presented by a network that places importance on presenting it in its original format (as was the case when Turner Classic Movies aired several of Hayao Miyazaki's works, which were presented both dubbed and subtitled). Most anime DVDs contain options for original Japanese, Japanese with subtitles, and English-dubbed, except for a handful of series that have been heavily edited or Americanized. In addition, Disney has a policy that makes its directors undergo stages to perfect alignment of certain lip movements so the movie looks believable.

In addition, a small number of British films have been re-dubbed when released in the United States, due to the usage of dialects which Americans are not familiar with (for example, Kes and Trainspotting). However, British children's shows (such as Thomas and Friends and Bob the Builder) have historically always been re-dubbed with American voice actors in order to make the series more understandable for American children. This slowly fell out of practice since the late 2000s. With the rising popularity of British children's shows such as Peppa Pig, which airs undubbed on Nick Jr., fewer and fewer British children's shows have been broadcast with American re-dubs. Conversely, British programs shown in Canada are typically not re-dubbed.

Some live-action television shows shown in the US have Spanish dubs. These are accessible though the SAP (secondary audio program) function of the television unit.

Many films have also been dubbed into indigenous languages of the United States and Canada. Disney's Moana, set in Hawaii, was dubbed into the Hawaiian language in 2018. The Navajo language has also received dubs of many films, the first three being Star Wars: Episode IV - A New Hope, Finding Nemo and Fistful of Dollars. The Navajo dubs of Star Wars and Finding Nemo are also available on Disney Plus.

Oceania

Australia
In common with other English-speaking countries, there has traditionally been little dubbing in Australia, with foreign language television programs and films being shown (usually on SBS) with subtitles or English dubs produced in other countries.

Because over 25% of Australians speak a language other than English at home, some cinemas show foreign-language films, for example in Chinese (the most spoken language in Australia other than English). There are also Chinese-language cinemas in Australia, such as the Hoyts Mandarin cinema in Chatswood, Sydney.

However, some TV commercials from foreign countries are dubbed, even if the original commercial came from another English-speaking country. Moreover, the off-screen narration portions of some non-fiction programs originating from the UK or North America are re-dubbed by Australian voice talents to relay information in expressions that Australians can understand more easily.

The first film to be dubbed into an Australian Aboriginal language was Fists of Fury, a Hong Kong martial arts film, which was dubbed into the Nyungar language of the Perth region in 2021. The first Indigenous Australian cartoon, Little J and Big Cuz, is available in English and several indigenous languages, including Gija, Nyungar, Torres Strait Creole, Palawa Kani, Warlpiri, Yolŋu, Arrernte, Pitjantjatjara and Kriol.

French Polynesia
French Polynesia almost exclusively shows films and television programs in either French or English. However, in 2016, Disney's Moana became the first film to be dubbed into the Tahitian language. However, the dub was only released in French Polynesia and is not available on any streaming services.

New Zealand
While New Zealand is an English-speaking country, a growing number of television programs and films have also been dubbed into the Māori language.

Many episodes of SpongeBob SquarePants and Dora the Explorer were dubbed into Māori and shown on Māori Television to promote the Māori language among children.

Disney has also started dubbing films into Māori. These films are shown in cinemas in New Zealand and some parts of Australia and then released globally on Disney Plus. In 2019, the film Moana was dubbed into Māori. In 2022, The Lion King and Frozen were dubbed into Māori.

Alternatives

Subtitles

Subtitles can be used instead of dubbing, as different countries have different traditions regarding the choice between dubbing and subtitling. On DVDs with higher translation budgets, the option for both types will often be provided to account for individual preferences; purists often demand subtitles. For small markets (small language area or films for a select audience), subtitling is more suitable, because it is cheaper. In the case of films for small children who cannot yet read, or do not read fast enough, dubbing is necessary.

In most English-speaking countries, dubbing is comparatively rare. In Israel, some programs need to be comprehensible to speakers of both Russian and Hebrew. This cannot be accomplished with dubbing, so subtitling is much more commonplace—sometimes even with subtitles in multiple languages, with the soundtrack remaining in the original language, usually English. The same applies to certain television shows in Finland, where Swedish and Finnish are both official languages.

In the Netherlands, Flanders, Nordic countries, Estonia and Portugal, films and television programs are shown in the original language (usually English) with subtitles, and only cartoons and children's movies and programs are dubbed, such as the Harry Potter series, Finding Nemo, Shrek, Charlie and the Chocolate Factory and others. Cinemas usually show both a dubbed version and one with subtitles for this kind of movie, with the subtitled version shown later in the evening.

In Portugal, one terrestrial channel, TVI, dubbed U.S. series like Dawson's Creek into Portuguese. RTP also transmitted Friends in a dubbed version, but it was poorly received and later re-aired in a subtitled version. Cartoons, on the other hand, are usually dubbed, sometimes by well-known actors, even on TV. Animated movies are usually released to the cinemas in both subtitled and dubbed versions.

In Argentina and Venezuela, terrestrial channels air films and TV series in a dubbed version, as demanded by law. However, those same series can be seen on cable channels at more accessible time-slots in their subtitled version and usually before they are shown on open TV. In contrast, the series The Simpsons is aired in its Mexican Spanish-dubbed version both on terrestrial television and on the cable station Fox, which broadcasts the series for the area. Although the first season of the series appeared with subtitles, this was not continued for the following seasons.

Dubbing and subtitling

In Bulgaria, television series are dubbed, but most television channels use subtitles for action and drama movies. AXN uses subtitles for its series, but as of 2008 emphasizes dubbing. Only Diema channels dub all programs. Movies in theaters, with the exception of films for children, use dubbing and subtitles. Dubbing of television programs is usually done using voiceovers, but usually, voices professional actors, while trying to give each character a different voice by using appropriate intonations. Dubbing with synchronized voices is rarely used, mostly for animated films. Mrs. Doubtfire is a rare example of a feature film dubbed this way on BNT Channel 1, though a subtitled version is currently shown on other channels.

Walt Disney Television's animated series (such as DuckTales, Darkwing Duck, and Timon & Pumbaa) were only aired with synchronized Bulgarian voices on BNT Channel 1 until 2005, but then the Disney shows were canceled. When airing of Disney series resumed on Nova Television and Jetix in 2008, voiceovers were used, but Disney animated-movie translations still use synchronized voices. Voiceover dubbing is not used in theatrical releases. The Bulgarian film industry law requires all children's films to be dubbed, not subtitled. Nova Television dubbed and aired the Pokémon anime with synchronized voices. Now, the show is airing on Disney Channel, also in a synchronized form.

Netflix provides both subtitles and dubbed audio with its foreign language shows, including Brazil's dystopian "3%" and the German thriller "Dark". Viewer testing indicates that its audience is more likely to finish watching a series if they select to view it with dubbed audio rather than translated subtitles. Netflix now streams its foreign language content with dubbed audio as default in an effort to increase viewer retention.

General use
Dubbing is also used in applications and genres other than traditional film, including video games, television, and pornographic films.

Video games

Many video games originally produced in North America, Japan, and PAL countries are dubbed into foreign languages for release in areas such as Europe and Australia, especially for video games that place a heavy emphasis on dialogue. Because characters' mouth movements can be part of the game's code, lip sync is sometimes achieved by re-coding the mouth movements to match the dialogue in the new language. The Source engine automatically generates lip-sync data, making it easier for games to be localized.

To achieve synchronization when animations are intended only for the source language, localized content is mostly recorded using techniques borrowed from movie dubbing (such as rythmo band) or, when images are not available, localized dubbing is done using source audios as a reference. Sound-synch is a method where localized audios are recorded matching the length and internal pauses of the source content.

For the European version of a video game, the on-screen text of the game is available in various languages and, in many cases, the dialogue is dubbed into each respective language, as well.

The North American version of any game is always available in English, with translated text and dubbed dialogue, if necessary, in other languages, especially if the North American version of the game contains the same data as the European version. Several Japanese games, such as those in the Dynasty Warriors, and Soul series, are released with both the original Japanese audio and the English dub included.

Television

Dubbing is occasionally used on network television broadcasts of films that contain dialogue that the network executives or censors have decided to replace. This is usually done to remove profanity. In most cases, the original actor does not perform this duty, but an actor with a similar voice reads the changes. The results are sometimes seamless, but, in many cases, the voice of the replacement actor sounds nothing like the original performer, which becomes particularly noticeable when extensive dialogue must be replaced. Also, often easy to notice, is the sudden absence of background sounds in the movie during the dubbed dialogue. Among the films considered notorious for using substitute actors that sound very different from their theatrical counterparts are the Smokey and the Bandit and the Die Hard film series, as shown on broadcasters such as TBS. In the case of Smokey and the Bandit, extensive dubbing was done for the first network airing on ABC Television in 1978, especially for Jackie Gleason's character, Buford T. Justice. The dubbing of his phrase "sombitch" (son of a bitch) became "scum bum," which became a catchphrase of the time.

Dubbing is commonly used in science fiction television, as well. Sound generated by effects equipment such as animatronic puppets or by actors' movements on elaborate multi-level plywood sets (for example, starship bridges or other command centers) will quite often make the original character dialogue unusable. Stargate and Farscape are two prime examples where ADR is used heavily to produce usable audio.

Since some anime series contain profanity, the studios recording the English dubs often re-record certain lines if a series or movie is going to be broadcast on Cartoon Network, removing references to death and hell as well. Some companies will offer both an edited and an uncut version of the series on DVD, so that there is an edited script available in case the series is broadcast. Other companies also edit the full-length version of a series, meaning that even on the uncut DVD characters say things like "Blast!" and "Darn!" in place of the original dialogue's profanity. Bandai Entertainment's English dub of G Gundam is infamous for this, among many other things, with such lines as "Bartender, more milk".

Dubbing has also been used for comedic purposes, replacing lines of dialogue to create comedies from footage that was originally another genre. Examples include the American television show Kung Faux, comedically re-dubbed from 1970s kung fu films originally produced in Hong Kong, the Australian television shows The Olden Days and Bargearse, re-dubbed from 1970s Australian drama and action series, respectively, the Irish show Soupy Norman, re-dubbed from Pierwsza miłość, a Polish soap opera, and Most Extreme Elimination Challenge, a comedic dub of the Japanese game show Takeshi's Castle.

Dubbing into a foreign language does not always entail the deletion of the original language. In some countries, a performer may read the translated dialogue as a voice-over. This often occurs in Russia and Poland, where "lektories" or "lektors" read the translated dialogue into Russian and Polish. In Poland, one announcer read all text. However, this is done almost exclusively for the television and home video markets, while theatrical releases are usually subtitled. Recently, however, the number of high-quality, fully dubbed films has increased, especially for children's movies. If a quality dubbed version exists for a film, it is shown in theaters. However, some films, such as Harry Potter or Star Wars, are shown in both dubbed and subtitled versions, varying with the time of the show. Such films are also shown on TV (although some channels drop them and do standard one-narrator translation) and VHS/DVD. 

In Russia, the reading of all lines by a single person is referred to as a Gavrilov translation, and is generally found only in illegal copies of films and on cable television. Professional copies always include at least two actors of opposite gender translating the dialogue. Some titles in Poland have been dubbed this way, too, but this method lacks public appeal, so it is very rare now.

On special occasions, such as film festivals, live interpreting is often done by professionals.

Pornography

As budgets for pornographic films are often small, compared to films made by major studios, and there is an inherent need to film without interrupting filming, it is common for sex scenes to be over-dubbed. The audio for such over-dubbing is generally referred to as the Ms and Gs, or the moans and groans.

Dubbing into varieties

In the case of languages with large communities (such as English, Chinese, Hindi, Portuguese, Italian, German, Spanish, or French), a single translation may sound foreign to native speakers in a given region. Therefore, a film may be translated into a certain variety of a certain language. For example, the animated movie The Incredibles was translated to European Spanish, Mexican Spanish, Neutral Spanish (which is Mexican Spanish but avoids colloquialisms), and Rioplatense Spanish (although people from Chile and Uruguay noticed a strong porteño accent from most of the characters of the Rioplatense Spanish translation). In Spanish-speaking regions, most media is dubbed twice: into European Spanish and Neutral Spanish.

Another example is the French dubbing of The Simpsons, which has two entirely different versions for Quebec and for France. The humor is very different for each audience (see Non-English versions of The Simpsons). Audiences in Quebec are generally critical of France's dubbing of The Simpsons, which they often do not find amusing.

Quebec-French dubbing of films is generally made in accent-free Standard French, but may sound peculiar to audiences in France because of the persistence of some regionally-neutral expressions and because Quebec-French performers pronounce Anglo-Saxon names with an American accent, unlike French performers. Occasionally, budget restraints cause American direct-to-video films, such as the 1995 film When the Bullet Hits the Bone, to be released in France with a Quebec-French dubbing, sometimes resulting in what some members of French audiences perceive as unintentional humor.

Portugal and Brazil also use different versions of dubbed films and series. Because dubbing has never been very popular in Portugal, for decades, children's films were distributed using the higher-quality Brazilian dub (unlike children's TV series, which are traditionally dubbed in European Portuguese). Only in the 1990s did dubbing begin to gain popularity in Portugal. The Lion King became the first Disney feature film to be completely dubbed into European Portuguese, and subsequently all major animation films gained European-Portuguese versions. In recent DVD releases, most Brazilian-Portuguese-dubbed classics were released with new European-Portuguese dubs, eliminating the predominance of Brazilian-Portuguese dubs in Portugal.

Similarly, in Flanders, the Dutch-speaking region of Belgium, cartoons are often dubbed locally by Flemish artists rather than using soundtracks produced in the Netherlands.

The German-speaking region, which includes Germany, Austria, part of Switzerland, and Liechtenstein, share a common German-dubbed version of films and shows. Although there are some differences in the three major German varieties, all films, shows, and series are dubbed into a single Standard German version that avoids regional variations in the German-speaking audience. Most voice actors are primarily German or Austrian. Switzerland, which has four official languages (German, French, Italian, and Romansh), generally uses dubbed versions made in each respective country (except for Romansh). Liechtenstein uses German-dubbed versions only.

Sometimes, films are also dubbed into several German dialects (Berlinerisch, Kölsch, Saxonian, Austro-Bavarian or Swiss German), especially animated films and Disney films. They are as an additional "special feature" to entice the audience into buying it. Popular animated films dubbed into German variety include Asterix films (in addition to its Standard German version, every film has a particular variety version), The Little Mermaid, Shrek 2, Cars, (+ Austrian German) and Up (+ Austrian German).

Some live-action films or TV series have an additional German variety dubbing: Babe and its sequel, Babe: Pig in the City (German German, Austrian German, Swiss German); and Rehearsal for Murder, Framed (+ Austrian German); The Munsters, Serpico, Rumpole (+ Austrian German), and The Thorn Birds
(only Austrian German dubbing).

Before German reunification, East Germany also made its own particular German version. For example, Olsen Gang and the Hungarian animated series The Mézga Family were dubbed in West Germany as well as East Germany.

Usually, there are two dubbings produced in Serbo-Croatian: Serbian and Croatian. Serbian for Serbia, Montenegro and Bosnia and Herzegovina; Croatian for Croatia and parts of Bosnia and Herzegovina.

References

Further reading

 
 Di Fortunato E. e Paolinelli M. (a cura di), "La Questione Doppiaggio - barriere linguistiche e circolazione delle opere audiovisive", Roma, AIDAC, 1996 - (available on website: www.aidac.it)
 Castellano A. (a cura di), "Il Doppiaggio, profilo, storia e analisi di un'arte negata", Roma, AIDAC-ARLEM, 2001
 Di Fortunato E. e Paolinelli M., "Tradurre per il doppiaggio - la trasposizione linguistica dell'audiovisivo: teoria e pratica di un'arte imperfetta", Milano, Hoepli, 2005
 ASINC  online magazine on criticism of the art of dubbing
 
 Rose, Jay, Producing Great Sound for Film and Video. Focal Press, fourth edition 2014 Book info.